

Alberta

 Alberta Horticultural Research Center, Brooks
 Calgary Zoological Gardens, Calgary
 Devonian Gardens (Calgary), Calgary
Cascades of Time Garden (Banff), Banff
 Lee Pavilion located within the Citadel Theatre, Edmonton
 Lethbridge Research and Development Centre, Lethbridge
 Muttart Conservatory, Edmonton
 Nikka Yuko Japanese Garden, Lethbridge
 Olds College Botanic Garden, Olds
 University of Alberta Botanic Garden, Devon, Alberta

British Columbia
 Abkhazi Garden, Victoria
 Bloedel Floral Conservatory, Vancouver
 Butchart Gardens, Victoria
 Crown Forest Industries Arboretum and Museum, Ladysmith
 Horticulture Centre of the Pacific, Victoria
 Park and Tilford Gardens, North Vancouver
 Queen Elizabeth Park and Bloedel Floral Conservatory, Vancouver
 Royal Roads University Botanical Gardens, Victoria
 Summerland Research Station, Summerland
 UBC Botanical Garden and Centre for Plant Research, Vancouver
 Tofino Botanical Gardens, Tofino
 VanDusen Botanical Garden, Vancouver
 Woodland Gardens Arboretum, Surrey, British Columbia, Surrey

Manitoba

 Assiniboine Park, Winnipeg
 Manitoba Horticultural Association Arboretum, Boissevain
 Morden Research Station, Morden

New Brunswick 

 Fredericton Botanic Garden, Fredericton
 Kingsbrae Horticultural Garden, St. Andrews
 New Brunswick Botanical Garden, Edmundston

Newfoundland and Labrador

 Memorial University of Newfoundland Botanical Garden, St. John's

Nova Scotia
 Annapolis Royal Historic Gardens, Annapolis Royal
 Faculty of Agriculture, Dalhousie University, Truro
 Harriet Irving Botanical Gardens, Wolfville
 Halifax Public Gardens, Halifax

Ontario

 Allan Gardens, Toronto
 Bruce Botanical Food Gardens, Ripley
 Centennial Conservatory, Thunder Bay
 Centennial Park Conservatory, Etobicoke
 Dominion Arboretum and Central Experimental Farm, Ottawa
 Great Lakes Forest Research Centre Arboretum, Sault Ste. Marie
 Fanshawe College Arboretum, London
 Humber College Arboretum, Toronto
 Inglis Falls Arboretum, Owen Sound
 Jackson Park, Windsor
 Lauber Arboretum, Kakabeka Falls
 Metro Toronto Parks Commission, Toronto
Edwards Gardens
James Gardens
Toronto Islands
 Niagara Parks Commission, Niagara Falls
 Oshawa Valley Botanical Gardens, Oshawa 
 Ottawa Valley Native Plant Botanical Garden, Cobden
 Parkwood, The R.S. McLaughlin Estate National Historic Site and Heritage Garden, Oshawa
 Plant Paradise Country Gardens, Caledon
 Quinte Botanical Garden, Frankford, Ontario
 Royal Botanical Gardens, Burlington
 Sifton Bog, London
 Toronto Botanical Garden, Toronto
 University of Guelph Arboretum, Guelph
 University of Toronto Erindale College Conservatory, Mississauga
 Toronto Zoo, Toronto
 University of Western Ontario Sherwood Fox Arboretum, London
 Vineland Research Station, Vineland

Quebec

 Belle Terre Botanic Garden, Otter Lake
 Montreal Botanical Garden, Montreal
 Jardins de Métis, Grand-Métis 
 Jardin Van Den Hende, Laval University, Quebec City
 Mont Royal Park, Montreal
 Man and His World, Montreal
 Morgan Arboretum, Macdonald Campus of McGill University, Sainte-Anne-de-Bellevue

Saskatchewan

 PFRA Tree Nursery, Indian Head
 University of Saskatchewan Gardens, Saskatoon
 Wascana Centre Authority, Regina
 Regina Floral Conservatory, Regina

References and notes
 (1981) Arboreta and Botanical Gardens of North America: a travellers guide HMS Press 

Botanical gardens in Canada
 
Canada